Air Line (sometimes spelled Airline) is an unincorporated community in Hart County, in the U.S. state of Georgia.

History
A post office called Air Line was established in 1856, and remained in operation until 1907. Besides the post office, Air Line had a railroad depot.

References

Unincorporated communities in Hart County, Georgia
Unincorporated communities in Georgia (U.S. state)